Jhumka is a town in the Sunsari District between Inaruwa and Itahari. It is about 7 kilometeres from the main city of Itahari. Some of the famous landmarks of jhumka are Jhumka Nahar, Jhumka Park, Pipraha Playground  etc. It is also the gateway to Ramdhuni Mandir, Auliya dham,Chatara and Barahkshetra Mandir.The town is developing. There are schools, health posts, departmental stores, major banks, and many stores around the town. 

Populated places in Sunsari District
Sunsari District